Krell is a surname. Notable people with the surname include:

 Nikolaus Krell ( 1551–1601), chancellor of the elector of Saxony
 William Krell (1868–1933), ragtime composer
 David Farrell Krell (born 1944), American philosopher

See also
 Kell (surname)
 Kroll

Surnames from nicknames